James Haughton may refer to:

 James Haughton (police officer) (1914–2000), British police officer
 James Haughton (reformer) (1795–1873), Irish social reformer, temperance activist and vegetarian
 James Haughton (activist) (1929–2016), American civil rights activist, labor leader, community organizer, and social worker
 James G. Haughton, American public health administrator